East Wapei Rural LLG is a local-level government (LLG) of Sandaun Province, Papua New Guinea. Ram (Sepik) and Wapei (Torricelli) languages are spoken in this LLG.

Wards
01. Kamnom (Awtuw language speakers)
02. Bulwo (Pouye language speakers)
03. Yiklau (Pouye language and Karawa language speakers)
04. Maurom (Pouye language speakers)
05. Kulnom
06. Kweftim
07. Eritei 2
08. Taute
09. Maui/Talbibi
10. Lumi
11. Oute
12. Tabale (Yau language (Torricelli) speakers)
13. Karate
14. Sainde
15. Mabul

References

Local-level governments of Sandaun Province